Breeja Larson (born April 16, 1992) is an American former competition swimmer who specializes in the breaststroke, and is an Olympic gold medalist.  She earned a gold medal in the 4×100-meter medley relay at the 2012 Summer Olympics.

Larson was born in Mesa, Arizona, one of seven sisters.  She later moved to Boise, Idaho, where she attended Centennial High School in Boise, Idaho for three years and graduated from Mountain View High School in Mesa in 2010.  She swam for the Centennial Patriot and Mountain View Toros high school swim teams.  As a senior, she was the state runner-up in the 100-yard breaststroke.  She also lettered in softball and track and field.

She attended Texas A&M University, where she swam for the Texas A&M Aggies swimming and diving team in National Collegiate Athletic Association (NCAA) competition from 2011 to 2014.  As a freshman, she finished second in both the 100-yard and 200-yard breaststroke at the 2011 NCAA Women's Swimming and Diving Championships; as a sophomore in 2012, she was the NCAA national champion in the 100-yard breaststroke, and finished third in the 200-yard event.  She was a senior during the 2013–14 school year. She also graduated from Titans of Investing, A&M Class 19.

At the 2012 United States Olympic Trials in Omaha, Nebraska, the qualifying meet for the 2012 Olympics, Larson made the U.S. Olympic team for the first time by winning the 100-meter breaststroke in a time of 1:05.92, ahead of favorite Rebecca Soni.  At the 2012 Summer Olympics in London, she earned a gold medal by swimming for the winning U.S. team in the preliminaries of the 4×100-meter medley relay. At the final 100-meter breaststroke, Larson false started.  However, it was determined there was a technical issue and she was allowed to compete.  She finished in sixth place.

See also

 List of Olympic medalists in swimming (women)
 List of Texas A&M University people
 List of United States records in swimming

References

External links
 
 
 
 
 
 

1992 births
Living people
American female breaststroke swimmers
Latter Day Saints from Texas
Medalists at the 2012 Summer Olympics
Olympic gold medalists for the United States in swimming
Sportspeople from Boise, Idaho
Sportspeople from Mesa, Arizona
Swimmers at the 2012 Summer Olympics
Texas A&M Aggies women's swimmers
World Aquatics Championships medalists in swimming
Latter Day Saints from Arizona
Latter Day Saints from Idaho